Herbert Francis Trentham (22 April 1908 – June 1979) was an English footballer who 
played as a full back. He was nicknamed "Corker".

Biography 
Trentham was born in Chirbury, Shropshire and attended Chirbury St John's School. In his youth he played football for Knighton Town, Knighton Victoria and Knighton United. He joined Hereford United in April 1926 and remained with them until April 1929, when he signed for West Bromwich Albion  for a £600 transfer fee. He made his Albion league debut in March 1930, in a Division Two match away at Blackpool. During the following season he helped the club to achieve promotion to the First Division and played in the 1931 FA Cup Final, in which Albion beat Birmingham 2–1. Trentham also appeared in the 1935 FA Cup Final, but this time earned only a runners-up medal as his team lost 4–2 to Sheffield Wednesday. After 272 appearances for West Bromwich Albion, he re-joined Hereford United on a free transfer in May 1937, remaining with the latter club until his move to Darlaston in August 1939. Following his retirement from football, Trentham ran an ironmonger's business in Ward End, Birmingham. He died in June 1979, aged 71.

References 
 

1908 births
1979 deaths
Footballers from Shropshire
English footballers
Association football fullbacks
Hereford United F.C. players
West Bromwich Albion F.C. players
Ironmongers
Darlaston Town F.C. players
English Football League players
English Football League representative players
FA Cup Final players
Knighton Town F.C. players